The Schwarzhorn is a mountain of the Swiss Lepontine Alps, located west of Vals in the canton of Graubünden. It lies on the range between the Lumnezia and the Valser Tal, south of the Faltschonhorn.

References

External links
 Schwarzhorn on Hikr

Mountains of the Alps
Mountains of Graubünden
Lepontine Alps
Mountains of Switzerland